McGovern is a census-designated place (CDP) in Washington County, Pennsylvania, United States. The population was 2,742 at the 2010 census.

Geography
McGovern is located at  (40.233547, -80.218492).

Demographics

At the 2000 census there were 2,538 people, 1,059 households, and 762 families living in the CDP. The population density was 1,355.0 people per square mile (524.0/km2). There were 1,093 housing units at an average density of 583.5/mi2 (225.7/km2).  The racial makeup of the CDP was 98.03% White, 1.58% African American, 0.12% Asian, and 0.28% from two or more races. Hispanic or Latino of any race were 0.51%.

Of the 1,059 households 24.0% had children under the age of 18 living with them, 61.4% were married couples living together, 8.3% had a female householder with no husband present, and 28.0% were non-families. 25.8% of households were one person and 15.5% were one person aged 65 or older. The average household size was 2.36 and the average family size was 2.83.

The age distribution was 19.1% under the age of 18, 5.1% from 18 to 24, 26.4% from 25 to 44, 26.2% from 45 to 64, and 23.2% 65 or older. The median age was 45 years. For every 100 females, there were 90.1 males. For every 100 females age 18 and over, there were 85.4 males.

The median household income was $39,417 and the median family income  was $46,250. Males had a median income of $43,088 versus $25,417 for females. The per capita income for the CDP was $20,437. About 2.7% of families and 2.7% of the population were below the poverty line, including 2.8% of those under age 18 and 1.2% of those age 65 or over.

References

Census-designated places in Washington County, Pennsylvania
Pittsburgh metropolitan area
Census-designated places in Pennsylvania